Riuler de Oliveira Faustino (25 January 1998 – 23 November 2021), commonly known as Riuler, was a Brazilian professional footballer who played as a midfielder.

Death
Riuler died of a heart attack on 23 November 2021, aged 23. He had suffered acute congestive heart failure.

Career statistics

Club
Notes

References

External links

1998 births
2021 deaths
Footballers from São Paulo
Brazilian footballers
Brazil youth international footballers
Association football midfielders
J1 League players
São Paulo FC players
Coritiba Foot Ball Club players
Club Athletico Paranaense players
Sport Club Internacional players
J.FC Miyazaki players
Shonan Bellmare players
FC Osaka players
Brazilian expatriate footballers
Brazilian expatriate sportspeople in Japan
Expatriate footballers in Japan